Events in the year 1948 in Taiwan, Republic of China.

Incumbents
 President – Chiang Kai-shek
 Vice President – Li Zongren
 Premier – Zhang Qun, Weng Wenhao, Sun Fo
 Vice Premier – Wang Yun-wu, Ku Meng-yu, Chang Li-sheng, Wu Tieh-cheng

Events
1948 Republic of China legislative election, the first direct elections since the country's founding, were held from 21–23 January with the First Legislative Yuan taking office on 18 May
Taiwan Provincial Common History Historica was established on 1 June in what is now Zhongxing New Village
CSBC Corporation, a shipbuilding company, split into Taiwan Machinery Corporation and Taiwan Shipbuilding Corporation
Taiwan Provincial Police Training Facilities became the Taiwan Provincial Police Academy
Taiwan Provincial Taitung Teachers' School, which later became National Taitung University, was established in Taitung City

Births
 25 April – Yu Shyi-kun, Premier of the Republic of China (2002-2005)
 1 June – Yeh Hsien-hsiu, politician and singer
 7 July – Chen Ping, actress
 17 September – Sung Chi-li, Buddhist religious leader

See also

References

 
Years of the 20th century in Taiwan